Nostalgie Vlaanderen (Nostalgie Flanders) is a private Belgian radio station broadcasting in Flanders and Brussels but can also be heard in some parts of Wallonia, and is dedicated to mainly music of the 1970s, 1980s and 1990s. Nostalgie Flanders is created on 20 March 2008, and is owned by Concentra Group, Corelio NV and the NRJ Group.

History

In March 2008, Nostalgie Vlaanderen started broadcasting on the former frequencies of the radio stations: Antwerpen 1, Radio Go, Radio Mango and Radio Contact Vlaanderen, and it was created by the media groups: Concentra N.V. and Corelio in collaboration with the NRJ Group, the largest radio group of Europe. The station competes with the nationwide commercial radio stations of the Vlaamse Media Maatschappij: Q-music and JOE fm.

Since 8 March 2010, Nostalgie can also be heard in the province of Limburg after the acquisition of the frequencies of EXQI FM.

Broadcasting area
Nostalgie Vlaanderen broadcasts on FM throughout Flanders and in Brussels on the following frequencies:

Antwerp
 Geel: 104,6 MHz
 Mechelen: 104,5 MHz
 Schoten: 102,9 MHz
 Turnhout: 104,5 MHz

East Flanders
 Aalst: 104,8 MHz
 Ghent: 103,5 MHz
 Oudenaarde: 104,8 MHz
 Ronse: 103,3 MHz
 Sint-Niklaas: 103,7 MHz

Flemish Brabant
 Aarschot: 104,4 MHz
 Brussels 1: 98,1 MHz
 Brussels 2: 98,4 MHz
 Diest: 99,0 MHz
 Leuven: 103,8 MHz

Limburg
 Beringen: 92,8 MHz (FM)
 Bree: 103,0 MHz
 Genk: 94,7 MHz
 Hasselt: 96,8 MHz
 Lommel: 95,9 MHz
 Overpelt: 104,2 MHz
 Sint-Truiden: 96,9 MHz
 Tongeren: 94,8 MHz

West Flanders
 Bruges: 88,1 MHz
 Egem: 98,2 MHz
 Kortrijk: 88.0 MHz
 Ostend: 87.6 MHz
 Oostvleteren: 101.0 MHz

Outside Belgium
Nostalgie Vlaanderen is also available on the internet, but can also be heard clearly on FM, near and beyond the borders in several countries on the following frequencies:

France
 Nord-Pas-de-Calais : 101.0 MHz

Netherlands
 Limburg : 94.7 MHz, 103.0 MHz
 North Brabant : 102.9 MHz
 South Holland (South) : 102.9 MHz
 Zeeland : 102.9 MHz, 103.5 MHz

Dutch-language radio stations in Belgium
Radio stations established in 2008